The 1924 Oklahoma Sooners football team represented the University of Oklahoma in the 1924 college football season. In their 20th year under head coach Bennie Owen, the Sooners compiled a 2–5–1 record (2–3–1 against conference opponents), finished in sixth place in the Missouri Valley Conference, and were outscored by their opponents by a combined total of 80 to 28.

No Sooners were recognized as All-Americans, and back Obie Bristow was the only Sooner to receive all-conference honors.

Schedule

Roster

References

Oklahoma
Oklahoma Sooners football seasons
Oklahoma Sooners football